Habrosyne fraterna is a moth in the family Drepanidae. It is found in India (Himachal Pradesh).

References

Moths described in 1888
Thyatirinae